Akova (Greek: Άκοβα) is a settlement in the community and municipal unit of Argos, Greece.  Akova is 4 km west of downtown Argos. There are an Agia Triada church and a rest area for those hiking around Larissa mountain.

Historical population

See also
List of settlements in Argolis

References

Populated places in Argolis